Roger Dilkes (born 16 August 1948) is an English former football referee who officiated in the Football League and Premier League. During his time on the National List he was based in Mossley, Lancashire.

Career
Dilkes became a Football League linesman in 1980 and reached the Referees List just three years later at the age of thirty four. In March 1988 he handled the Merseyside derby between Everton and Liverpool. This would be a key match in any circumstances but took on far greater significance as Liverpool were aiming to set a (then) record of thirty matches unbeaten from the start of the season. Everton won 1–0, inflicting one of only two League defeats all season on Liverpool, who subsequently won the Title.

He continued to receive good appointments, many in the old First Division, as well as Lancashire derbies. He did not achieve FIFA status - he may have been unlucky in that only one vacancy occurred during his most eligible years. When more opportunities arose in 1992 he was then too old according to FIFA's newly introduced age criteria.

Dilkes was nevertheless chosen as one of the first set of Premier League referees for the 1992–93 season, and he retained this position for the final five years of his career. This period also saw him handle his most senior Cup appointments. The pinnacle was an FA Cup semi-final in 1994 between Chelsea and Luton Town. Two years later he officiated in a League Cup semi-final second leg as Leeds United overcame Birmingham City. The following year he took charge of an FA Cup quarter-final between Sheffield Wednesday and Wimbledon before retiring at the end of the 1996–97 campaign.

References

Print

Football League Handbooks, 1980-1982
Rothmans Football Yearbooks, 1983-1997

Internet

External links
Roger Dilkes Referee Statistics (incomplete) at soccerbase.com

1948 births
English football referees
People from Mossley
Living people
English Football League referees
Premier League referees